Jugoslav Vasović (born 31 May 1974 in Belgrade, SR Serbia, SFR Yugoslavia) is a Serbian retired water polo player who played for FR Yugoslavia at the 2000 Summer Olympics.

He retired from the sport in 2012 after playing the last season with Red Star Belgrade. His older brother Anto Vasović also played water polo professionally.

Club career
After starting out in the VK Partizan youth system, Vasović moved to Jadran Split where he got his first taste of full squad water polo at the Mediterranean Cup in İzmir.

Clubs
1990–91 -  Jadran Split
1991–94 -   Red Star Belgrade
1994–95 -  VK Budva
1995–01 -  VK Bečej
2001–02 -  AC Palaio Faliro
2002–03 -  RN Florentia
2003–04 -  Shturm Chekhov
2004–05 -  VK Partizan
2005–08 -  RN Florentia
2008–09 -  VK Partizan
2009–11 -  Al-Qadisiya
2011–12 -  Red Star Belgrade

Personal
Vasović's son Anto, named after Jugoslav's older brother, is a professional footballer. 

He also has 3 children: 2 sons (Anto and Marko) and a daughter Teodora.

See also
 List of Olympic medalists in water polo (men)

References

External links
 

1974 births
Living people
Yugoslav male water polo players
Serbia and Montenegro male water polo players
Serbian male water polo players
Olympic water polo players of Yugoslavia
Olympic bronze medalists for Federal Republic of Yugoslavia
Water polo players at the 2000 Summer Olympics
Sportspeople from Belgrade
Olympic medalists in water polo
Medalists at the 2000 Summer Olympics